Giovanna Venetiglio Matheus (born December 3, 1989) is a retired Brazilian trampoline gymnast. She won a bronze medal in individual trampoline at the 2007 Pan-American Games held in her hometown, Rio de Janeiro. She also won a bronze medal at the Kawasaki stage of the 2011 Trampoline World Cup series in Japan in the same event. Giovanna was part of the Brazilian delegation competing in the 2011 Pan American Games held in Guadalajara, Mexico, placing fifth.

References

External links 
 Giovanna Athletic Profile in UOL (Portuguese)
 Beijing Olympics Best of 2008 (Portuguese)
 2011 Trampoline World Cup Results - Individual Women's Trampoline (Final)

Brazilian female trampolinists
Gymnasts at the 2007 Pan American Games
Gymnasts at the 2011 Pan American Games
Living people
1989 births
Pan American Games bronze medalists for Brazil
Pan American Games medalists in gymnastics
Medalists at the 2007 Pan American Games
21st-century Brazilian women